Jean-François Van Der Motte (8 December 1913 – 8 October 2007) was a cyclist from  Belgium. He won a bronze medal in the team road race at the 1936 Summer Olympics along with Auguste Garrebeek and Armand Putzeys.

References

1913 births
2007 deaths
Belgian male cyclists
Olympic cyclists of Belgium
Olympic bronze medalists for Belgium
Cyclists at the 1936 Summer Olympics
Olympic medalists in cycling
Cyclists from Brussels
Medalists at the 1936 Summer Olympics
20th-century Belgian people